Huang Haiqiang (born 8 February 1988 in Zhejiang) is a Chinese high jumper.

He won the 2005 World Youth Championships and the 2006 World Junior Championships, the latter in a personal best jump of 2.32 metres. He competed at the 2007 World Championships without reaching the final.

He represented his country in the high jump at the 2008 Summer Olympics, but came in dead last.

He won the 2009 national championships with a jump of 2.24 metres, his best result since the 2007 athletics season.

Competition record

References

 
 Team China 2008

1988 births
Living people
Chinese male high jumpers
Athletes (track and field) at the 2008 Summer Olympics
Olympic athletes of China
Athletes from Zhejiang
Asian Games medalists in athletics (track and field)
Athletes (track and field) at the 2006 Asian Games
Athletes (track and field) at the 2010 Asian Games
Asian Games bronze medalists for China
Medalists at the 2010 Asian Games
21st-century Chinese people